The Schaulager is a museum in Newmünchenstein, a sub-district of Münchenstein in the canton of Basel-Country, Switzerland.

Built in 2002/2003 under commission of the Laurenz Foundation, it was designed by the renowned architectural office of Herzog & de Meuron, the Schaulager opened in 2003. The Schaulager was conceived as an open warehouse that provides the optimal spatial and climatic conditions for the preservation of works of art.

The institution functions as a mix between public museum, art storage facility and art research institute. It is primarily directed at a specialist audience but is also open to the general public for special events and the annual exhibitions.

Annual exhibitions 
 2003: Roth-Zeit. A retrospective on Dieter Roth
 2004: Herzog & de Meuron. Number 250. An exposition
 2005: Jeff Wall. Photographs from 1978 to 2004
 2006: Tacita Dean. Analogue: Films, Photographs, Drawings 1991–2006  and Francis Alÿs. "The Sign Painting Project (1993–97)": A revision»
 2007: Robert Gober. Work 1976–2007
 2008: Andrea Zittel, Monika Sosnowska. 1:1
 2009: Holbein to Tillmans. Prominent guests from the Kunstmuseum Basel
 2010: Matthew Barney. Prayer Sheet with the Wound and the Nail
 2011: Francis Alÿs. Fabiol
 2013: Steve McQueen.
 2014: Paul Chan. Selected Works
 2018: Bruce Nauman: Disappearing Acts (in collaboration with MoMa)

The collection from the Emanuel Hoffmann Foundation forms the main core of the Schaulager exhibits. This collection was founded in 1933 by Maja Hoffmann-Stehlin (* 7. August 1896; † 8. August 1989), later known as Maja Sacher, wife of Paul Sacher (* 28 April 1906 – † 26 May 1999).

See also 
Museums in Basel

External links 
Schaulager website

References

Modern art museums
Contemporary art galleries in Switzerland
Münchenstein
Art museums established in 2003
2003 establishments in Switzerland
Museums in Basel-Landschaft
Art museums and galleries in Switzerland